Tadhg Mac Lochlainn (fl. 1907 – May 1999) was an Irish local historian. Mac Loughlin was a native of Killure, near Ballinasloe, and an innovator in the promotion of local studies, been the author of half-a-dozen books on the subject, as well a number of articles. He was a member of Conradh na Gaeilge, the Gaelic Athletic Association, the National Athletic and Cycling Association, Oireachtas na Gaeilge and several other Irish cultural organisations. He was secretary of a committee which pioneered the erection of the Battle of Aughrim Memorial, was first secretary of the Ballinasloe Development Association and a member of An Taisce.

His son Ray McLoughlin was a former Ireland international rugby union player

Select bibliography
 Inniu agus Inne
 The Parish of Aughrim and Kilconnell
 Ahascragh/Caltra
 Killure/Fohena
 The Parish of Lawrencetown and Kiltormer, 1982

External links
 https://openlibrary.org/a/OL1058142A/Tadhg_Mac_Lochlainn
 http://www.ballinasloe.org/articles/article.php?ID=8
 http://www.ballinasloe.org/articles/people.php

1930 births
1999 deaths
20th-century Irish historians
People from Ballinasloe
Writers from County Galway